Flagman Ahead is the fifth album by the acid jazz band Tab Two. It contains the hit single "No Flagman Ahead".

Critical reception
The Calgary Herald wrote: "Rhythmic enough to get you movin' and yet sweet enough to mellow to, it flows and grows in a space somewhere between 1950s Paris and a London rave."

Track listing
 MBN Trumpet Intro - 1:06
 No Flagman Ahead - 5:19
 Wanna Lay (On Your Side) - 5:24
 Swingbridge - 4:35
 (There's) Not A Lot - 5:20
 Watchagonnado - 4:36
 Schubertplatz - 5:53
 Vraiment Paris - 4:49
 Tab Jam - 4:49
 Curfew - 5:06
 Permanent Protection - 5:28
 No Flagman Ahead (Fog Mix) - 5:18

References

1995 albums
Tab Two albums